Myristica cinnamomea is a species of plant in the Myristicaceae (Nutmeg) family. It is found in Sumatra, Peninsular Malaysia, Singapore and Borneo.

References

cinnamomea
Trees of Sumatra
Trees of Malaya
Trees of Borneo
Least concern plants
Taxonomy articles created by Polbot